Tosia is a genus of starfish belonging to the family Goniasteridae. The species of this genus are found in Australia, New Zealand, and South Africa.

Species 
The genus includes the following species:

 Tosia australis 
 Tosia magnifica 
 Tosia neossia

References

External links 
 

Goniasteridae
Asteroidea genera